Sacile is a railway station serving the town of Sacile, in the region of Friuli-Venezia Giulia, northern Italy. The station opened in 1855 and is located on the Venice–Udine railway and Sacile-Pinzano railway. The train services are operated by Trenitalia.

History
The station was located on the Sacile-Vittorio Veneto railway until its closure in 1918. The line was dismantled in 1923. Train services on the Sacile-Pinzano railway are currently limited to Maniago.

Train services
The station is served by the following service(s):

Night train (Intercity Notte) Trieste - Udine - Venice - Padua - Bologna - Rome
Express services (Regionale Veloce) Trieste - Gorizia - Udine - Treviso - Venice
Regional services (Treno regionale) Trieste - Gorizia - Udine - Treviso - Venice
Regional services (Treno regionale) Sacile - Aviano - Maniago - Pinzano - Gemona del Friuli Currently limited to Maniago

Bus services
Buses have replaces trains to Pinzano since July 2012.

See also

History of rail transport in Italy
List of railway stations in Friuli-Venezia Giulia
Rail transport in Italy
Railway stations in Italy

References

 This article is based upon a translation of the Italian language version as of January 2016.

External links

 Timetabled departures from the station

Railway stations in Friuli-Venezia Giulia